The W3C Software Notice and License is a permissive free software license used by software released by the World Wide Web Consortium, like Amaya. The license is a permissive license, compatible with the GNU General Public License.

Software using the License
Arena
Amaya
Libwww
Line Mode Browser

See also 
 Free software portal
 Software using the W3C license (category)
 World Wide Web Consortium

References

External links 
 Text of the license

Free and open-source software licenses